Miss Israel is a national beauty pageant in Israel. The pageant was founded in 1950, where the winners were sent to Miss Universe. The pageant was also existing to send delegates to Miss World, Miss International, Miss Europe and Miss Asia Pacific International. The 1973 competition was held in Menora Mivtachim Arena, Tel Aviv, and had 26 contestants. Limor Schreibman-Sharir was the winner.

Results

Judges
Binyamin Gibli
Lea Gottlieb
Hemda Nofech-Mozes
Ilana Rubina

References

External links
איזה יופי , איזה הבל
י " י T%\‬ ‭BSK553&J "v 5* c ' y, j 4 3י *י A u •If זי L" d* f( S if - י >־ % &!J ־‭* jf^l י L3 \&

1973 beauty pageants
1973 in Israel
Miss Israel
Events in Tel Aviv
1970s in Tel Aviv